Marche funèbre  may refer to:
 Funeral march
 Marche funèbre (Chopin), a section of Frédéric Chopin's Piano Sonata No. 2 in B-flat minor
 Marche Funèbre (EP), EP by Soap&Skin